Rosa 'Gene Boerner' is a pink Floribunda rose cultivar, bred by Eugene Boerner and introduced into the United States by Jackson & Perkins in 1968, in honor of Boerner. The cultivar was named an All-America Rose Selections winner in 1969.

History
Rosa 'Gene Boerner' was bred by American hybridizer, Eugene Boerner, director of research at Jackson & Perkins. The new rose was introduced after Boerner's death (September 5, 1966) and released in honor of his work. "Papa Floribunda", as Boerner was known, was a world renowned rose breeder, and a pioneer in the development of Floribundas.  Boerner developed more than 60 floribunda rose cultivars during his 45-year career at Jackson & Perkins; eleven Boerner rose cultivars were given the All-America Rose Selections (AARS) award.

Description
'Gene Boerner' is a vigorous, slender, upright shrub, 3 to 4 ft (91-121 cm) in height with  a 2 to 3 ft (60-91 cm) plant spread. Petals are typically 2-3 inches, full form, and have 26-40 petals. The flowers are borne singly and in small clusters. Flowers are medium pink, with a mild fragrance. 'Gene Boerner' is a disease resistant plant and thrives in USDA zone, 5 and warmer. The plant is almost continuously in bloom from spring through fall. The foliage is mid-green and glossy.

Sports
The sport, Rosa 'White Gene Boerner', was discovered by Yoshiho Takatori in Japan in 1978. The plant grows to a height of 4-6 feet (120 to 185 cm) and a spread of 3 feet (90 cm). There are typically 35 petals, that are white in color with pink edges, 4 inches (10 centimeters) in diameter on average.

Awards
 All-America Rose Selections winner, USA, (1969)

See also
Garden roses
Rose Hall of Fame
List of Award of Garden Merit roses

Notes

References
 

Gene Boerner